Nippononebria virescens is a species of ground beetle in the family Carabidae, found in western North America.

References

Further reading

 

Nebriinae
Articles created by Qbugbot
Beetles described in 1870